Moniteau School District is a small rural public school district in Butler County, Pennsylvania, Located on PA 308. The boroughs of Cherry Valley and Eau Claire, and West Sunbury, as well as the townships of Venango, Marion, Cherry, Washington, Concord, and Clay are within district boundaries. According to 2010 federal census data, the resident population grew to 9,285 people. In 2000, the US Census Bureau reported the district served a resident population of 9,186. The educational attainment levels for the population 25 and over were 87.4% high school graduates and 12.0% college graduates. Moniteau School District is one of 9 full or partial public school districts operating in Butler County and one of 500 public school districts of Pennsylvania.

In 2009, Moniteau School District residents’ per capita income was $15,848, while the median family income was $39,904. In the Commonwealth, the median family income was $49,501 and the United States median family income was $49,445, in 2010. By 2013, the median household income in the United States rose to $52,100.

The district operates two schools: Moniteau Junior Senior High School (7th-12th) and Dassa Mckinney Elementary School (K-6th)

High school students may choose to attend Butler County Area Vocational Technical School  for training in the culinary arts, cosmetology, construction and mechanical trades. The Midwestern Intermediate Unit MIU4 provides the district with a wide variety of services like specialized education for disabled students and hearing, speech and visual disability services and professional development for staff and faculty.

Governance
Moniteau School

Extracurriculars
The district offers a wide variety of clubs, activities and an extensive, publicly funded sports program.

Sports
The district funds:
Varsity

Boys
Baseball - AA
Basketball - AA
Cross country - AA
Football - AA
Golf - AA
Track and field - AA

Girls
Basketball - AA
Cross country - A
Golf - AA
Softball - AA
Track and field - AA
Volleyball - A

Junior high middle school sports

Boys
Baseball
Basketball
Cross country
Football
Soccer
Track and field
Wrestling 

Girls
Basketball
Cross country
Field hockey
Softball 
Track and field
Volleyball

According to PIAA directory July 2014

References

School districts in Butler County, Pennsylvania